The 1988 Irish Masters was the fourteenth edition of the professional invitational snooker tournament, which took place from 22 to 27 March 1988. The tournament was played at Goffs in Kill, County Kildare, and featured twelve professional players.

Steve Davis won the title for the fourth time, beating Neal Foulds 9–4 in the final.

Main draw

References

1988 in snooker
Irish Masters
1988 in Irish sport
Irish Masters